Alma Academia Leidensis refers to an illustrated book about the professors of the University of Leiden, the Netherlands.

The most common version of the book Illustrium Hollandiae Westfrisiae ordinum alma academia Leidensis was published in 1614 and contained a series of engraved portraits of Leiden professors. Six versions were identified by the Amsterdam bibliographer Frederik Muller in 1888, that were published in 1609, 1613, 1614, 1617, 1715 and 1716. Muller made a list of the engravings and later J.F. van Someren made a concordance of the portraits from all the various editions, as some of the portraits were redone by later artists. Identifiable engravers were Crispijn van de Passe and Jan van de Velde.

The 1614 version included 5 "blank" engravings, possibly because the subjects had died before anyone could make their likeness, or because their likenesses were not ready in time for publication and book-buyers would be able to paste these in at a later date:

References
 Illustrium Hollandiae Westfrisiae ordinum alma academia Leidensis, Dedication portraits and portraits of Leiden professors, along with 4 scenes of university, library, anatomical room & hortus, by Jacob Marci and Justum a Colster, Leiden University, 1614, in Google books
Concordance Alma Academia Leidensis, compiled from 6 versions published between 1609-1716, published in Beschrijvende catalogus van gegraveerde portretten van Nederlanders, edited by J. F. van Someren, as a sequel to Frederik Muller's Catalogus van 7000 portretten van Nederlanders, published by the Frederik Muller Foundation, 1888 in Amsterdam 

1614 books
History of Leiden
Academic staff of Leiden University